Delavan's Vitrified Brick Street stretches across three blocks of Walworth Avenue in Delavan, Wisconsin. It was added to the National Register of Historic Places in 1996.

The Delavan Post Office is located on the stretch of road.

References

Geography of Walworth County, Wisconsin
Roads on the National Register of Historic Places in Wisconsin
Infrastructure completed in 1913
1913 establishments in Wisconsin
National Register of Historic Places in Walworth County, Wisconsin
Delavan, Wisconsin